Talis arenella is a moth in the family Crambidae described by Émile Louis Ragonot in 1887. It is found in Tunisia and Algeria.

The wingspan is 28–29 mm.

Subspecies
Talis arenella arenella
Talis arenella algirica P. Leraut, 2012 (Algeria)

References

Ancylolomiini
Moths described in 1887
Moths of Africa